Calliostoma scurra is a species of sea snail, a marine gastropod mollusk in the family Calliostomatidae.

Description
The size of the shell varies between 12 mm and 14 mm.

Distribution
This species occurs in the Caribbean Sea off Venezuela and Suriname at depths between 18 m and 77 m.

References

 Quinn, J. F. Jr. 1992. New species of Calliostoma Swainson, 1840 (Gastropoda: Trochidae), and notes on some poorly known species from the Western Atlantic Ocean. Nautilus 106: 77-114

External links

External links
 To Biodiversity Heritage Library (1 publication)
 To Encyclopedia of Life
 To USNM Invertebrate Zoology Mollusca Collection
 To World Register of Marine Species

scurra
Gastropods described in 1992